Margrethe Røed (born 10 December 1976) is a Norwegian television presenter on NRK Barne-Tv and Super Barne-TV on the television and radio channel NRK Super.

In 2009, she took part in the TV programme Skal vi danse? on TV 2 with the dancer Asmund Grinaker.

Røed has also been on the television programmes Beat for beat and De ukjente. In 2009/10 she finally took maternity leave in the seventh month of pregnancy and returned with her son Cajus to show the TV audience.

References

External links 
 filmfront.no: Margrethe Røed

Norwegian television presenters
1976 births
Living people